The highest-selling albums and mini-albums in Japan are ranked in the Oricon Weekly Chart, which is published by Oricon Style magazine. The data are compiled by Oricon based on each album's weekly physical sales. In 2007, 41 albums reached the peak of the charts.

R&B singer Kumi Koda's Black Cherry had the longest run of 2007. The album stayed atop of the charts for four consecutive weeks becoming the first female studio album since Ayumi Hamasaki's Duty in 2000. Korean pop singer BoA's Made in Twenty (20) made her the second artist after Ayumi Hamasaki to have five constructive number-one studio albums since her debut. Ayumi Hamasaki simultaneously released her greatest hits collection A Best 2; which consists of two albums A Best 2: White and A Best 2: Black. The former took the number-one spot while the latter took #2, making Hamasaki the first female artist in thirty-six years to take the Top two spots on the charts.

American pop group Backstreet Boys' Unbreakable became the first album of a foreign male group to top the Oricon for two consecutive weeks since O-Zone's DiscO-Zone in 2005. Other artists who had an extended run on the charts include Kaela Kimura, Mr. Children, Yui, Mariya Takeuchi, Namie Amuro, Sukima Switch, Hideaki Tokunaga, and Ketsumeishi. Folk rock singer Kazumasa Oda's Jiko Best 2 makes him the oldest artist, at 60 years old, to have a number-one album on the chart. Canadian pop punk singer Avril Lavigne's The Best Damn Thing made her the first foreign artist to sell a million copies since her debut album.

The best-selling album overall of 2008 was Mr. Children's Home which sold over 1,181,000 copies. The second best-selling album was Koda's Black Cherry, which sold 1,022,000 copies, followed by Kobukuro's All Singles Best, which was released September 2006 selling over 850,000 copies. The fourth- and fifth-best-selling albums was Lavigne's The Best Damn Thing and Hamasaki's A Best 2: White respectively. The Best Damn Thing sold 840,000 while A Best 2: White sold 716,000 copies.

Chart history

References

Japan Albums
2007
2007 in Japanese music